The 1925 Pittsburgh mayoral election was held on Tuesday, 3 November 1925. It resulted in a landslide victory for Republican candidate Charles H. Kline.

Republican primary
Incumbent Republican mayor William A. Magee's career took a downturn when he broke with state Senator Max G. Leslie, a party boss who had sponsored Magee's candidacy in the previous election. Leslie, determined to prevent the mayor's re-election, pushed for Judge Charles H. Kline of the Allegheny County Court of Common Pleas to succeed Magee. Kline attracted endorsements from other Republican leaders, including William Larimer Mellon, who along with his uncle Andrew W. Mellon was commonly (if not accurately) credited with controlling Pittsburgh politics. Faced with dwindling party support and a shortage of campaign funds, Magee withdrew from the field.

With Magee out of the running, the Republican primary was just a formality as Kline trounced William L. Smith, principal of Allegheny High School.

General election
In the general election, Kline trampled his token opposition. His opponents were Smith, who had re-entered the race on Non-Partisan and Prohibition tickets, and little-known Democrat Carman C. Johnson, a teacher at Westinghouse High School.

The Republican Party also won all seats by an overwhelming margin in the coinciding city council elections.

Kline received 68,469 votes on the Republican ticket and 1,362 votes on the Labor Party slate.
†Smith received 10,745 votes on Non-Partisan and 4,465 votes on Prohibition ballots.

References

1925
1925 United States mayoral elections
1920s in Pittsburgh
November 1925 events
1925 Pennsylvania elections